Philip George Jeffreys Baker (born 1975) is a former Great Britain international rower.

Baker was educated at Abingdon School where he was captain of the Abingdon School Boat Club eights before moving on to Oxford Brookes University Boat Club.

He represented Great Britain at the 1999 World Rowing Championships winning a silver medal in the Lightweight Men's Eights. The following year Baker repeated the feat in the 2000 World Rowing Championships winning a silver medal again in the Lightweight Men's Eights. In addition to the world championship silver in 2000 he also won a silver medal at the 2000 World Rowing Cup in the Lightweight Men's Pair.

See also
 List of Old Abingdonians

References

Living people
1975 births
English male rowers
People educated at Abingdon School
World Rowing Championships medalists for Great Britain